Martin Hore (fl.1642–1691) was an Irish Jacobite politician.

Hore was the younger son of Matthew Hore. In 1685, on the accession of James II of England, Hore was granted the manor of Rosmire, totalling 3,987 acres. In 1689, he was elected as a Member of Parliament for Dungarvan in the Patriot Parliament. He was attainted in 1691.

References

Year of birth unknown
Year of death unknown
17th-century Irish people
Irish Jacobites
Irish MPs 1689
Members of the Parliament of Ireland (pre-1801) for County Waterford constituencies
People convicted under a bill of attainder